Siad or SIAD may refer to:
Siad (name)
 Șiad, a village in Craiva, Romania
 Self-injury Awareness Day, a grassroots annual global awareness event on March 1
 Sierra Army Depot,  California, United States
 Syndrome of inappropriate antidiuresis, a syndrome characterized by excessive unsuppressible release of antidiuretic hormone
 Surrey Institute of Art & Design, University College in the United Kingdom
 Supersonic Inflatable Aerodynamic Decelerator (SIAD), the main part of Low-Density Supersonic Decelerator